The 1909 Grand National was the 71st renewal of the Grand National horse race that took place at Aintree near Liverpool, England, on 26 March 1909.

Finishing order

Non-finishers

References

 1909
Grand National
Grand National
20th century in Lancashire
March 1909 sports events